Chennai, with historically rich records dating at least from the time of the Pallavas, houses 2,467 heritage buildings within its metropolitan area (CMA), the highest within any metropolitan area limit in India. Most of these buildings are around 200 years old and older. Chennai is home to the second largest collection of heritage buildings in the country, after Kolkata. The official list of heritage buildings was compiled by the Justice E. Padmanabhan committee. The Tamil Nadu Assembly passed the Heritage Commission Act in 2012 to preserve old heritage structures.

The structures will be categorised into three grades, namely, Grades I, II, and III. Grade I structures will be prime landmarks upon which no alterations will be permitted. Under Grade II, external changes on structures will be subject to scrutiny. Buildings under Grade III may be changed for 'adaptive reuse' with suitable internal and external changes.

Heritage activism
Heritage buildings are defined as notified structures of historical, architectural, or cultural significance. The heritage activism in the city began with the erstwhile Moore Market building fire in 1985. In 1997, the state government initiated action to conserve heritage buildings. In 1998, a committee headed by Director of Town and Country Planning was constituted by the government to investigate aspects related to enactment of the Heritage Act. In 1999, the committee submitted the draft of Tamil Nadu Heritage Conservation Act. In the same year, Chennai Metropolitan Development Authority (CMDA) constituted a Heritage Conservation Committee to draft regulations to conserve heritage buildings and precincts in the Chennai Metropolitan Area (CMA). After the second master plan for the city was approved by the government on 2 September 2008, special rules for conservation of heritage buildings/precincts came into force. In 2010, the criteria for listing the heritage structures in the CMA region was finalised, and in 2011, the process of assessment and documentation of heritage structures began. A 17-member Heritage Commission was set up in May 2012 to maintain these structures, after a fire accident in Kalas Mahal, a 244-year-old heritage building in front of Marina beach. As per the Commission's mandate, heritage buildings that are listed will get incentives, such as exemption from payment of taxes, and offenders who deface or destroy them will face penal action.

In 2012, a list of heritage buildings was released by the Chennai Metropolitan Development Authority (CMDA) under the heritage conservation committee's (HCC) supervision. Criteria considered for notification as heritage structure include period of construction, exhibited trend, events or persons associated with the structure, and design, style, designer, physical condition, and design integrity for architecturally significant buildings. The CMDA was expected to clear the first list of 70 heritage buildings compiled by the HCC. However, in 2013, the process of notification was delayed after 65 owners objected to the inclusion of their premises in the list. The Heritage Conservation Committee, however, overruled their objections. Of the structures/precincts that figure on the list, 42 are government buildings and the remaining are private ones. The government buildings include the main building of the College of Engineering Guindy under Anna University, Madras High Court, General Post Office, Music and Dance College, Saidapet Teachers' College and King Institute of Preventive Medicine. Theosophical Society is one of the private premises that are expected to get listed as a heritage structure. When a building is notified as a heritage structure, the onus of repair and maintenance of the heritage structure will be on the structure's owner. In July 2018, documentation of the last phase covering 192 of the 467 buildings listed by Justice E. Padhmanaban Committee began.

Grading of heritage structures
The heritage structures have been classified into three grades, viz. Grade I, II, and III. Grade I includes buildings and precincts of national or historical importance, with excellence in architecture, style and design. These structures remain the chief landmarks of the city. Save for some minimal changes approved by the Heritage Conservation Committee (HCC), no intervention, both on the interior and on the exterior, will be permitted in these structures. Grade II includes those structures of regional or local importance with special architectural or aesthetic merit, cultural or historical value. Although internal changes to the structures and adaptive reuse are allowed, here, too, external changes are allowed after scrutiny by the HCC. Extension or construction of additional buildings in the same plot are permissible as long as they are in harmony with the existing structure, especially in terms of facade and height. Grade III includes structures of importance for town spaces. These structures evoke architectural or aesthetic interest, but not as much as the Grade II structures. Changes to both external and internal portions of the buildings are generally permissible for Grade III buildings.

Structures listed by the HCC

Prominent buildings on the HCC's list include:
 Madras High Court
 St. Thomas Cathedral Basilica, Chennai
 Anderson Church, Parry's
 Church of Our Lady of Light (Luz Church), Mylapore
 General Post Office, Rajaji Salai
 Royapuram Railway Terminal
 Theosophical Society Headquarters Building, Besant Avenue, Besant Nagar
 City Civil Court Building, NSC Bose Road, Park Town
 Madras Engineering College (Main Building), Anna University, Sardar Patel Road, Guindy
 Bharathiyar Illam, Triplicane
 Madras Club (Moubray's Cupola), Adyar Club Gate Road

Structures that remain to be documented include:
 Loyala College, Nungambakkam
 Horticultural Society, Cathedral Road
 Royapettah Clock Tower, Chennai
 The Hindu, Anna Salai
 Kamarajar Arangam, Anna Salai
 Department of Public Instruction, College Road
 Panagal Park, T. Nagar
 Music Academy, TTK Road
 CSI School of the Deaf, Santhome High Road

Buildings on the heritage list that do not exist any more include:
 Chennai Central Prison, Park Town
 Old Sacred Heart Shrine, Pantheon Road
 Roxy Theatre, Purasawalkam High Road
 Old Jail, Prakasam Road
 Old building of Kalaivanar Arangam, Wallajah Road

List of heritage structures

See also
 Architecture of Chennai
 Heritage conservation
 Architectural conservation

References

Further reading
 

 
Buildings and structures in Chennai
History of Chennai
Chennai-related lists
Chennai, Heritage
Tourist attractions in Chennai
Lists of buildings and structures in Tamil Nadu